Ma Gui (1543–1617) was the general of the armies of the Ming Dynasty between 1589 and 1610. A member of the Hui minority of China, he served the Han rulers with great loyalty. He participated in various campaigns against the Mongols  in his career, and serving with great distinction, he led Ming force in the second Japanese Invasions of Korea his final position was the commander of Liaodong Peninsula.

Also, Ma Gui was the founder of a Korean clan, the Shanggu Ma clan.

Footnotes

Sources 
 History of the Ming chapter 238

16th-century Chinese people
17th-century Chinese people
1543 births
1607 deaths
Ming dynasty generals
Hui people
Generals of the medieval Islamic world
People of the Japanese invasions of Korea (1592–1598)
Shanggu Ma clan
Gui